In Your Direction may refer to:

 In Your Direction (album), an album by Ratt
 "In Your Direction", a song by Ratt from their second album Out of the Cellar